The National Institute of Physics (NIP) was established in 1983 by Presidential Executive Order No. 889 which transformed the Department of Physics of the College of Arts and Sciences into one of the seven research and academic institutes of the University of the Philippines Diliman - College of Science.

In 1997, the NIP has been designated as a Center of Excellence by the Commission on Higher Education. The research institute offers bachelor's degree, master's degree and doctorate degrees in Physics. The research institute has also produced the first gravitational physicist in the Philippines.

Research groups 
The institute's faculty, graduate and undergraduate students are actively engaged in research in the following areas: Condensed Matter, Instrumentation Physics, Photonics, Structure and Dynamics, Theoretical Physics.

Research Collaborations 
In February 2014, the European Organization for Nuclear Research (CERN) donated computer equipment to NIP to improve their theoretical high-energy physics research capabilities.

In February 2021, the Philippine's Maya-2 nanosatellite was successfully launched. This project was a collaboration between the Department of Science and Technology's Advanced Science & Technology Institute (ASTI) and UP Diliman's NIP, Electronics Engineering Institute, Institute of Environmental Science and Meteorology, and Department of Geodetic Engineering.

Images

References

External links

 

University of the Philippines Diliman
1983 establishments in the Philippines
Research institutes established in 1983
Research institutes in Metro Manila
Establishments by Philippine presidential decree